Alfred Blau (died 23 February 1896) was a French dramatist and opera librettist. He was a cousin of Édouard Blau, another French librettist of the same period.

In late 1887 he was in negotiations with Emmanuel Chabrier for a libretto on the subject of The Tempest by Shakespeare, but the project came to nothing.

Operas to librettos by Alfred Blau
Jules Duprato
Le Chanteur florentin with Édouard Blau, (1866)
Ernest Reyer
Sigurd with Camille du Locle (1884)
Jules Massenet
Esclarmonde with Louis de Gramont (1889)

References

External links
 

French opera librettists
1896 deaths
Year of birth missing
19th-century French dramatists and playwrights
French male dramatists and playwrights
19th-century male writers